This article shows all participating team squads at the 2007 Women's NORCECA Volleyball Championship, held from September 16 to September 21, 2007 in the Investors Group Athletic Centre in Winnipeg, Canada.

Head Coach: Naoki Miyashita

Head Coach: Eladio Vargas

Head Coach: Antonio Perdomo

Head Coach: Beato Miguel Cruz

Head Coach: Macario González

Head Coach: Juan Carlos Núñez

Head Coach: Francisco Cruz Jiménez

Head Coach: Lang Ping

References
US Volleyball 

N
S